NBT Bank, N.A. is an American financial institution that operates through a network of 140 banking locations in New York, Pennsylvania, Vermont, Massachusetts, New Hampshire, Maine and Connecticut. NBT Bank and its parent company, NBT Bancorp Inc., are headquartered in Norwich, New York, United States. NBT Bancorp is traded on the Nasdaq Global Select Market under the symbol NBTB.

History 

Founded in 1856, NBT Bank was first a state-chartered bank called the Bank of Norwich. On June 28, 1865, the bank received a national charter (which it holds to this day) and changed its name to the National Bank of Norwich. In 1918, NBT Bank was one of the first national banks in New York State to apply for and receive trust powers under a Federal Reserve Act and established a Trust Department. In 1925, NBT Bank changed its name a second time to better reflect its expanded services. Over the years, the area served by NBT Bank expanded and in 1989 the bank changed its name for the third time to The National Bank and Trust Company without "of Norwich." In 1995, the bank changed its name for the fourth time to NBT Bank, N.A. (The "N.A." stands for "National Association" and is used primarily in formal or legal contexts.) At the same time, NBT Bank introduced its current logo featuring a blue star and red lettering.

In 2016, NBT Bank celebrated its 160th year in business and published an updated history of the bank to commemorate this milestone.

Mergers and acquisitions 
NBT Bank completed its first acquisitions in the 1930s. Since that time, the bank has continued to grow through bank and branch acquisitions as well as through organic expansion.

Since 2000, NBT Bank acquired the following banks: LA Bank based in Scranton, Pennsylvania in 2000; Pioneer American Bank based in Carbondale, Pennsylvania in 2000; First National Bank of Northern New York based in Norfolk, New York in 2001; Central National Bank based in Canajoharie, New York in 2001; City National Bank and Trust Company based in Gloversville, New York in 2005; Hampshire First Bank based in Manchester, New Hampshire in 2012; and Alliance Bank based in Syracuse, New York in 2013. The merger with Alliance Bank was completed on March 8, 2013 and is NBT Bank's largest to date. In December 2022, NBT announced that it will acquire the Connecticut-based Salisbury Bancorp in an equity transaction valued at $204 million.

Naming rights 
NBT Bank owns the naming rights to NBT Bank Stadium in Syracuse, New York.

References

External links 
 

Banks established in 1856
Banks based in New York (state)
Companies listed on the Nasdaq
Economy of Syracuse, New York
Mortgage lenders of the United States